Mahonia ehrenbergii is a shrub in the Berberidaceae described as a species in 1847. It is native to the State of Chiapas in southern Mexico.

References

ehrenbergii
Flora of Chiapas
Plants described in 1847